The Melodic Major (also known as the Aeolian dominant scale, Olympian Scale, Mixolydian 6 [or 13], Aeolian major, and Hindu Scale) is the fifth mode of the melodic minor scale. It is named such because it is seen as a justifying the Augmented second in the harmonic major scale, by flattening the 7th, making it closer to the sixth, and thus closing the Augmented Second. Aeolian dominant typically refers to music that uses the scale both ascending and descending, whereas melodic major is used for music that ascends in the major scale and descends in aeolian dominant.

It corresponds to Raga Charukeshi in Indian Classical music.

This scale can also be obtained by raising the third degree of the natural minor scale or lowering the sixth degree of the mixolydian scale.

The name melodic major also refers to the combined scale that proceeds as natural major ascending and as Aeolian dominant descending.

The Mask of Zorro song "I Want to Spend My Lifetime Loving You", was composed in the Aeolian dominant scale mode. It was written by film composer James Horner.

The Aeolian dominant scale mode can also be heard in the song Valar Morghulis of the Game of Thrones: Season 2 soundtrack, composed by Ramin Djawadi.

See also
 Backdoor progression

References

Modes (music)